Eumorpha intermedia, the intermediate sphinx, is a moth of the family Sphingidae. The species was first described by Benjamin Preston Clark in 1917. It lives in the US states of North Carolina, Florida, Mississippi, Louisiana, and southern Texas.

It is similar to Eumorpha pandorus and Eumorpha satellitia licaon, but closer to the latter. The forewing underside is dark brown with a distinct pink tinge, especially on the hindwing. The hindwing upperside is similar in color to Eumorpha satellitia licaon.

Adults are on wing from April to October. They nectar at various flowers.

The larvae feed on Ampelopsis arborea and possibly Vitis species. There are green and red-brown forms. Early instars have a long white horn with a black tip, which is not present for the final instar. Pupation takes place in a shallow underground chamber.

References

External links

Eumorpha
Moths described in 1917